Yegor Yurevich Solomatin (also transliterated Yegor Yurievich Solomatin; born October 3, 1964) is a member of the State Duma of Russia. He is currently a member of the State Duma's Committee on Budget Issues and Taxes. He is a member of the Liberal Democratic Party of Russia (LDPR) and is its First Deputy Chief. Solomatin has a degree from the Moscow Energy Power Institute.

References 

1964 births
Living people
Liberal Democratic Party of Russia politicians
Second convocation members of the State Duma (Russian Federation)
Third convocation members of the State Duma (Russian Federation)
Fourth convocation members of the State Duma (Russian Federation)